Mexico City Metro Line 3 is one of the 12 metro lines built in Mexico City, Mexico.

Line 3 is the longest line, its color is olive green and it runs from north to south of the city covering almost all of it.

It is built under Avenida de los Insurgentes, Guerrero, Zarco, Balderas, Cuauhtémoc, Universidad, Copilco and Delfín Madrigal avenues. It interchanges with Line 6 at Deportivo 18 de Marzo, Line 5 at La Raza, Line B at Guerrero, Line 2 at Hidalgo, Line 1 at Balderas, Line 9 at Centro Médico. and Line 12 at Zapata.

Chronology 
20 November 1970: from Tlatelolco to Hospital General
25 August 1978: from Tlatelolco to La Raza
1 December 1979: from La Raza to Indios Verdes
7 June 1980: from Hospital General to Centro Médico
25 August 1980: from Centro Médico to Zapata
30 August 1983: from Zapata to Universidad

Rolling stock
Line 3 has had different types of rolling stock throughout the years.

Alstom MP-68: 1970–1981
Concarril NM-73: 1978–1981
Concarril NM-79 1982–present
Alstom MP-82 1985–1994
Concarril NM-83 1990–present
Bombardier NC-82: 2004–2012

The NM-79 trains were made in Mexico in 1979 by Concarril and the NM-83A trains were made in México by Concarril between 1983 and 1991.

Currently, out of the 390 trains in the Mexico City Metro network, 50 are in service in Line 3, more than in any other line.

Station list 

The stations from north to south:
 
{| class="wikitable" rules="all"
|-
!rowspan="2" | No.
!rowspan="2" | Station
!rowspan="2" | Date opened
!rowspan="2" | Level
!colspan="2" | Distance (km)
!rowspan="2" | Connection
!rowspan="2" | Location
|-
!style="font-size: 65%;"|Betweenstations
!style="font-size: 65%;"|Total
|-
|style="background: #; color: white;"|01
|Indios Verdes 
| rowspan="3" |December 1, 1979
| rowspan="3" |Ground-level, underground access
|style="text-align:right;"|-
|style="text-align:right;"|0.0
|
 : Line 1: Indios Verdes station
 Indios Verdes
 : Line 1: Indios Verdes station
 : Line 3: Indios Verdes station
 : Line 7: Indios Verdes station
  Line IV: Indios Verdes station
 Line 2: Indios Verdes station (under construction)
 Routes: 101, 101-A, 101-B, 101-D, 102, 107-B (at distance), 108
|rowspan="4"|Gustavo A. Madero
|-
|style="background: #; color: white;"|02
|Deportivo 18 de Marzo 
|style="text-align:right;"|1.3
|style="text-align:right;"|1.3
|
  Line 6
 Deportivo 18 de Marzo
  Line 1: Deportivo 18 de Marzo station
  Line 6: Deportivo 18 de Marzo station
 Route: 15-B
|-
|style="background: #; color: white;"|03
|Potrero 
|style="text-align:right;"|1.1
|style="text-align:right;"|2.4
|
 Potrero
  Line 1: Potrero station
 Routes: 25, 104
 Route: 15-C
|-
|style="background: #; color: white;"|04
|La Raza 
|August 25, 1978
| rowspan="3" |Underground, trench
|style="text-align:right;"|1.2
|style="text-align:right;"|3.6
|
  Line 5
 La Raza
  Line 1: La Raza station
  Line 3: La Raza station
  Line IV: La Raza station (under construction)
 Routes: 11-A (at distance), 12 (at distance), 23, 27-A, 103
  Line 1: La Raza stop (north–south route)
 Routes: 7-D (at distance), 20-C, 20-D
|-
|style="background: #; color: white;"|05
|Tlatelolco
| rowspan="7" |November 20, 1970
|style="text-align:right;"|1.6
|style="text-align:right;"|5.2
|
  Line 3: Tlatelolco station
 Routes: 10-D, 10-E
|rowspan="8"|Cuauhtémoc
|-
|style="background: #; color: white;"|06
|Guerrero 
|style="text-align:right;"|1.1
|style="text-align:right;"|6.3
|
  Line B
  Line 3: Guerrero station
 Routes: 10-E, 11-C
|-
|style="background: #; color: white;"|07
|Hidalgo 
|Underground, trench (Lv. -2)
|style="text-align:right;"|0.9
|style="text-align:right;"|7.2
|
  Line 2
 (at distance)
  Line 3: Hidalgo station
  Line 4: Hidalgo station (north route)
  Line 7: Hidalgo station
<li> Temporary Line 1 service: Hidalgo stop
<li> Route: 27-A

<li>  Line 5: Metro Hidalgo stop
<li> Route: 16-A
|-
|style="background: #; color: white;"|08
|Juárez 
|Underground,trench
|style="text-align:right;"|0.4
|style="text-align:right;"|7.6
|
<li>
<li>  Line 3: Juárez station
<li>  Line 4: Juárez station (south route)<li> Temporary Line 1 service: Juárez stop

|-
|style="background: #; color: white;"|09
|Balderas 
|Underground, trench (Lv. -2)
|style="text-align:right;"|0.7
|style="text-align:right;"|8.4
|
<li>
<li>  Line 1
<li>  Line 3: Balderas station
<li> Temporary Line 1 service: Balderas stop
<li> Route: 34-A (also temporary Line 1 service)

<li> Routes: 19-E, 19-F, 19-G, 19-H
|-
|style="background: #; color: white;"|10
|Niños Héroes / Poder Judicial CDMX 
| rowspan="7" |Underground trench
|style="text-align:right;"|0.8
|style="text-align:right;"|9.2
|
<li> (at distance)
|-
|style="background: #; color: white;"|11
|Hospital General 
|style="text-align:right;"|0.8
|style="text-align:right;"|9.9
|
<li>
<li>  Line 3: Hospital General station
<li>  Line 2: Hospital General stop
<li>  Line 2: Dr. Lucio stop (at distance)
<li> Routes: 9-E (at distance), 19-F
|-
|style="background: #; color: white;"|12
|Centro Médico 
|June 7, 1980
|style="text-align:right;"|0.8
|style="text-align:right;"|10.7
|
<li>  Line 9
<li>
<li>  Line 3: Centro Médico station
<li> Routes: 9-C, 9-E
|-
|style="background: #; color: white;"|13
|Etiopía / Plaza de la Transparencia 
| rowspan="4" |August 25, 1980
|style="text-align:right;"|1.5
|style="text-align:right;"|12.3
|
<li>
<li>  Line 2: Etiopía / Plaza de la Transparencia station
<li>  Line 3: Etiopía / Plaza de la Transparencia station
|rowspan="5"|Benito Juárez
|-
|style="background: #; color: white;"|14
|Eugenia
|style="text-align:right;"|1.0
|style="text-align:right;"|13.3
|
<li>
<li>  Line 3: Eugenia station
|-
|style="background: #; color: white;"|15
|División del Norte
|style="text-align:right;"|0.8
|style="text-align:right;"|14.1
|
<li>
<li>  Line 3: División del Norte station
|-
|style="background: #; color: white;"|16
|Zapata 
|style="text-align:right;"|1.0
|style="text-align:right;"|15.1
|
<li>  Line 12 (out of service)
<li> Zapata
<li>
<li>  Line 3: Pueblo Santa Cruz Atoyac station (at distance)
<li> Routes: 1-D, 52-C, 120, 121-A (also temporary Line 12 service)
<li>  Line 3: Zapata 1 stop, Zapata 2 stop
<li> Route: 6-A
|-
|style="background: #; color: white;"|17
|Coyoacán
| rowspan="5" |August 30, 1983
|Undergrounddeep trench 
|style="text-align:right;"|1.2
|style="text-align:right;"|16.4
|
<li> (at distance)
<li> Route: 200
<li> Route: 22-A (at distance)
|-
|style="background: #; color: white;"|18
|Viveros / Derechos Humanos 
| rowspan="2" |Undergrounddouble tunnel
|style="text-align:right;"|1.0
|style="text-align:right;"|17.4
|
<li> Viveros
<li> Route: 116-A
|rowspan="4"|Coyoacán
|-
|style="background: #; color: white;"|19
|Miguel Ángel de Quevedo 
|style="text-align:right;"|1.0
|style="text-align:right;"|18.4
|
<li> Miguel Ángel de Quevedo
<li> Route: 34-B
<li>  Line 7: Miguel Ángel de Quevedo stop
|-
|style="background: #; color: white;"|20
|Copilco 
|Undergrounddeep trench
|style="text-align:right;"|1.4
|style="text-align:right;"|19.8
|
<li> Routes: 123-A, 125, 128
|-
|style="background: #; color: white;"|21
|Universidad 
|Ground-level, overground access
|style="text-align:right;"|1.5
|style="text-align:right;"|21.3
|
<li> Universidad
<li> Routes: 17-E, 123-A, 125, 128, 134-C, 134-D, 162-D
<li> Route: 2-E
<li> Pumabús (services Ciudad Universitaria)
|}

Renamed stations

Ridership
The following table shows each of Line 3 stations total and average daily ridership during 2019.

Tourism
Line 3 passes near several places of interest:
Plaza de las Tres Culturas, square in the Tlatelolco neighborhood.
Historic center of Mexico City
Ciudad Universitaria, the main campus of the National Autonomous University of Mexico

See also 
 List of Mexico City Metro lines
 2023 Mexico City Metro train crash

Notes

References 

1970 establishments in Mexico
3
Railway lines opened in 1970